Robert Groenewegen (born 4 August 1960) is a former Australian rules footballer who played 79  matches for the Footscray Football Club between 1978 and 1986, kicking a total of 29 goals in his Victorian Football League (VFL) career. He was recruited from Braybrook.

Predominantly wearing the number 14 guernsey throughout his career. He is now the ground manager at Aurora Stadium in Launceston which hosts several AFL matches every year.

External links 
 Aurora stadium site
 

Western Bulldogs players
Braybrook Football Club players
Glenorchy Football Club players
Glenorchy Football Club coaches
North Launceston Football Club players
Williamstown Football Club players
Australian rules footballers from Victoria (Australia)
1960 births
Living people